The Mass in D by Ethel Smyth is a setting of the mass ordinary for vocal soloists, chorus and orchestra.

Background
Smyth composed the Mass following a renewal of her High Anglican belief, stimulated by reading a copy of The Imitation of Christ, by Thomas à Kempis, while she was ill in Munich on Christmas Eve 1889. The book belonged to her Catholic friend Pauline Trevelyan, to whom Smyth dedicated the Mass. She composed much of it while a guest of Empress Eugénie at Cape Martin, near Monaco, in the summer of 1891.

Eugénie was also a friend of Queen Victoria. In October 1891, Smyth was staying with Eugénie on the estate of Balmoral Castle when the Queen paid a visit. Smyth gave a rendition at the piano of two movements of the Mass, and the Queen invited her to the castle where she gave another, longer rendition. Alfred, Duke of Edinburgh subsequently asked the Royal Choral Society to schedule the premiere. This took place on 18 January 1893 in the Royal Albert Hall, conducted by Joseph Barnby. The soloists were Esther Palliser, Belle Cole, Ben Davies and Robert Watkin-Mills.

The reception in the Albert Hall was enthusiastic, as were some reviews: J. A. Fuller Maitland praised the work's structure and rich orchestration. George Bernard Shaw wrote that the Mass was a sign of the rise of woman composers, though he called the work "the light literature of church music". Smyth was stung by what she saw as the patronising attitude of many reviewers towards a female composer.

After composing the Mass, her religious belief faded. She turned to opera, following the advice of conductor Hermann Levi, who praised her aptitude for dramatic composition when she showed him the Mass in Munich. After composing her first opera, Fantasio, she travelled around Europe during the mid-1890s seeking to arrange a premiere for it, and also a further performance of the Mass. In fact, the Mass was not performed again anywhere until 1924. Smyth blamed this on prejudice against female composers.

The Mass was revived on 7 February 1924 by the Birmingham Festival Choral Society, conducted by Adrian Boult. Its success prompted the arrangement of another performance on 8 March 1924 at Queen's Hall in London. George Bernard Shaw now thought the Mass "magnificent". In the years following, it was performed a number of times. In 1934 a performance of the Mass conducted by Thomas Beecham, attended by Queen Mary, was the culmination of the Festival Concerts celebrating Smyth's 75th birthday.

The Mass received its United States premiere in a performance by the Plymouth Music Series conducted by Philip Brunelle, its U.S. East Coast premiere in a performance on 23 January 1993 by the Monmouth Civic Chorus conducted by Mark Shapiro, and its New York City premiere in Carnegie Hall on 14 April 2013 in a performance by The Cecilia Chorus of New York, conducted by Mark Shapiro.

A performance billed as 'the first Proms performance since the composer’s own lifetime' was given at the BBC Proms at the Royal Albert Hall London on 20th August 2022 by the BBC Symphony Orchestra, BBC Symphony Chorus and soloists conducted by Sakari Oramo.

The Mass in D Australian premiere was performed on the 9th of October 2022, by Camberwell Chorale, conducted by Douglas Heywood OAM

Structure
The work is divided into six parts:
Kyrie
Credo
Sanctus
Benedictus
Agnus Dei
Gloria

This was the concert order in 1893 and 1924. Although the score was printed with the movements ordered as in Catholic liturgy, with the Gloria coming second, it included a note stating Smyth's preference for the Gloria to be performed last. Anglican services of the time had the Gloria at the end, but Smyth later wrote that her only reason for it was to finish triumphantly. According to musicologist Donald Tovey, the joyful mood sustained in the Gloria is an example of the close attention which Smyth paid to matching the music to the religious meaning of every part of each movement's text. 

The Mass remains almost entirely in D minor or D major throughout. The Kyrie starts with the bass section entering softly, joined successively by the other sections, and builds to a choral crescendo, which then subsides. Chorus and orchestra also dominate in the Credo, with a fugal "Crucifixus", short fugal sections at "Dominum et vivificantem", and ending with a fugal "et vitam venturi".

The Sanctus starts with alto solo, joined by the soprano and alto sections, who continue in the lyrical "pleni sunt coeli", leading into a climax, with an eight-part chorus for the "Hosanna". The Benedictus, for soprano solo and the soprano and alto sections, is soaring and melodious. There is a contrapuntal theme for cor anglais, and a trumpet joins the solo at the "Hosanna". The Agnus Dei is for tenor solo and chorus. 

The Gloria starts with an orchestral outburst and then a change in time signature at "et in terra pax", where what Tovey calls a "radiant melody" is taken up first by the tenor solo and then by the other parts. This is succeeded by a number of further themes.

Notes

References

Compositions by Ethel Smyth
Smyth, Ethel
1891 compositions
Compositions in D major